William Chapman (dates unknown) was an English professional cricketer who played in a single first-class cricket match in 1803.

Chapman is known to have played for Nottingham Cricket Club between 1791 and 1817. He made his sole first-class appearance for a combined Nottinghamshire and Leicestershire side.

References

External links

English cricketers
English cricketers of 1787 to 1825
Year of birth unknown
Year of death unknown